Astakatti is a village in Dharwad district of Karnataka, India.

Demographics
As of the 2011 Census of India there were 109 households in Astakatti and a total population of 520 consisting of 275 males and 245 females. There were 81 children ages 0-6.

References

Villages in Dharwad district